The Regional Transportation District (RTD) operates a mass transit network, serving portions of Denver, Colorado, United States, and its surrounding metropolitan area, with light rail and commuter rail services. , the  urban rail transit system includes 74 stations on 10 lines: A, B, D, E, G, H, L, N, R, and W. In first quarter of 2016, the six light rail lines served an average 79,600 passengers a day, making the RTD light rail the eighth-largest light rail system in the United States in terms of ridership.

All of the stations are open-air structures featuring passenger canopies for protection from adverse weather conditions. The RTD has established criteria for station design with the intention of incorporating each station effectively into its surrounding community. All stations feature three elements according to the criteria: the platform, its transition plaza and the intermodal passenger transport available to and from the facility. Platforms are designed to accommodate four-car trains and may be in either a side, island or side center style. The transition plaza is the area where passenger services can be found between the platform and where intermodal access is available. All stations are decorated with works of public art as part of the RTD's "Art-n-Transit" program.  They include independent works as well as pieces incorporated into the canopies, columns, pavers, windscreens, fencing and landscaping.

Light rail service began on October 8, 1994, with the opening of the initial fourteen stations on the  Central Corridor segment from 30th & Downing station to I-25 & Broadway station. The first extension opened on July 14, 2000, and included the completion of an additional  of rail and five stations through its present southern terminus at Littleton–Mineral station. In 2002, a four station,  spur through the Central Platte Valley opened between the 10th & Osage station and Union Station. On April 26, 2013 the W Line was opened which added  of rail and eleven stations between Auraria West station and the Jefferson County Government Center–Golden station in Golden, Colorado. The first commuter rail line, the A Line to Denver Airport station, opened on April 22, 2016.

Rail services use a zone-based fare system, where passengers are charged based on the number of zones through which they are traveling.  Fare zones are noted A, B, and C, based on distance from Downtown Denver, with a separate airport zone for travel to and from Denver Airport station.

Stations

Future stations
FasTracks is a twelve-year, $6.9 billion public transportation expansion developed by the Regional Transportation District and currently underway. The first expansion undertaken was the West Corridor between Denver and Golden which opened April 26, 2013. The second expansion and first commuter rail line to open was the University of Colorado A Line between Denver and Denver International Airport on April 22, 2016. The G Line commenced service in April 2019. The North Metro Rail Line (N line) commenced service in September 2020.

Former stations

, three RTD stations have been removed from the system: 29th & Welton, 14th & California, and 14th & Stout, all on the D Line in Downtown Denver.

Notes

References

Transportation in Denver
Denver RTD

Denver RTD Light Rail
Denver RTD